Emoia mokolahi is a species of lizard in the family Scincidae. It is found in Tonga.

References

Emoia
Reptiles described in 2012
Taxa named by George Robert Zug
Taxa named by Ivan Ineich
Taxa named by Gregory Pregill
Taxa named by Alison M. Hamilton